Simpelejärvi is a medium-sized lake in the Parikkala municipality in South Karelia region in Finland.

See also
List of lakes in Finland

References

Rautjärvi
South Karelia
Lakes of Parikkala